Chan Yui Chong (born 4 January 1983) is a Hong Konger wheelchair fencer who has been part of the national team since 2002. She has competed for her country at the Summer Paralympics, the Asian Para Games and at the IWAS World Championships.

Sporting career
Chan Yui Chong joined the Hong Kong wheelchair fencing team in 2002. Chan took up the sport after being inspired by a music video featuring a fencer. When at the 2004 Summer Paralympics in Athens, Greece, she won three gold medals and a silver in the épée B at the age of 21. She won two further gold medals at the 2008 Games in Beijing, China, including a defeat of China's Yao Fang in the final of the épée B.

At the 2012 Summer Paralympics, Chan made it to the semi-finals in the épée B competition once more. She was defeated 15-14 by Zhou Jingjing of China. However, when she fought Germany's Simone Briese-Baetke, Chan was this time victorious by the same scoreline, winning the bronze medal event for the second time in a row. Her further success was praised by Chief Executive of Hong Kong Leung Chun-ying. Chan competed at the 2014 Asian Para Games in Incheon, South Korea, where she won gold in the foil B, but placed second in the épée B following defeat by China's JingJing Zhou.

Personal life
She is married to fellow wheelchair fencer Tam Chik-sum. Chan enjoys fishing as a hobby.

References

External links 
 

1983 births
Living people
Wheelchair fencers at the 2004 Summer Paralympics
Wheelchair fencers at the 2008 Summer Paralympics
Wheelchair fencers at the 2012 Summer Paralympics
Wheelchair fencers at the 2016 Summer Paralympics
Hong Kong people
Medalists at the 2004 Summer Paralympics
Medalists at the 2008 Summer Paralympics
Medalists at the 2012 Summer Paralympics
Medalists at the 2016 Summer Paralympics
Paralympic medalists in wheelchair fencing
Paralympic gold medalists for Hong Kong
Paralympic silver medalists for Hong Kong
Paralympic bronze medalists for Hong Kong